is a private university located in the city of Hachinohe, Aomori Prefecture, Japan, established in 1972.

Departments and graduate school programs

Departments
Department of Mechanical Engineering
Department of Electric and Electronic Systems
Department of System and Information Engineering
Department of Biotechnology and Environmental Engineering
Department of Civil Engineering and Architecture
Department of Kansei Design

Graduate school programs
Doctor of Engineering Program in Mechanical and Biochemical Engineering
Doctor of Engineering Program in Electronic, Electrical and Information Engineering
Doctor of Engineering Program in Civil Engineering
Doctor of Engineering Program in Architectural Engineering

References

External links
Official website 
Official website 

Educational institutions established in 1972
Private universities and colleges in Japan
Universities and colleges in Aomori Prefecture
Engineering universities and colleges in Japan
Hachinohe